The  (French: Concert Bolero), Op. 166, is a composition for harmonium or organ without pedal by Alfred Lefébure-Wély. It was first published in 1865. The composition was adapted for wind instruments.

History 
Lefébure-Wély was a gifted pianist and organist who studied at the Paris Conservatoire from age 14, including composition with Fromental Halévy who was known for his operas. Lefébure-Wély held organist positions at several major churches in Paris, including the La Madeleine and Saint-Sulpice, Paris. It is suitable as a postlude (sortie) in church services. The composition was first published in 1865.

Recordings 
In 1988, organist David Britton played  as part of an organ recital recording, with music by mostly French composers. It appears on a 2006 recording of music by Lefébure-Wély played and arranged by organist Joachim Enders and trumpeter Manfred Bockschweiger at the Klais organ in St. Wolfgang near Dieburg. Martin Setchell included the piece in a recording of French organ music, volume VII of the series Great Australasian Organs, played at the Rieger organ of Christchurch Town Hall, which was silenced by the 2011 Christchurch earthquake.  was selected for the presentation of the new Rieger organ of the Vienna Cathedral in a recording with organist .

References

External links
 
 Martin Setchell Organ Concert: The Organist Entertains ncma.nz 2018
 

1865 compositions
Compositions for organ
Boleros